Alupenhue Airport,  is an airport  southeast of Molina, a city in the Maule Region of Chile.

There is mountainous terrain in all quadrants.

See also

Transport in Chile
List of airports in Chile

References

External links
OpenStreetMap - Alupenhue
OurAirports - Alupenhue
FallingRain - Alupenhue Airport

Airports in Chile
Airports in Maule Region